(Townley) Blackwood Price(1815-1902)  was Archdeacon of Down from 1889 until 1899.

Price was born in County Down, educated at Trinity College, Dublin and ordained in 1839. After a curacy at Smithfield and Shankhill he held incumbencies in Newtownards, Bright, County Down and Downpatrick.

Notes

Church of Ireland priests
19th-century Irish Anglican priests
1902 deaths
1815 births
Archdeacons of Down
Alumni of Trinity College Dublin
People from County Down